"Tartuffe" is a 1965 Australian television film directed by Henri Safran and starring Tony Bonner and Ron Haddrick. It was an episode of Wednesday Theatre and filmed in Sydney at ABC's Gore Hill Studios.

Australian TV drama was relatively rare at the time.

Plot
Tartuffe convinces the rich merchant Organ he is a saint. Organ agrees for Tartuffe to marry his daughter although Tartuffe is actually interested in seducing Organ's wife.

Cast
Ron Haddrick as Tartuffe
Jennifer Wright as Elmire
Doreen Warburton as Dorine
John Gregg as Oleante
Ron Morse as Organ
Roberta Hunt as Mmse Pernelle
Charles Little as Damis
Lucia Duchenski as Marianne
John Stevens as Loyale
Jerome White as an officer
Doris Goddard as street girl
Tony Bonner as Valere

Production
Henri Safran said the play was "less a satire of hypocrisy than a condemnation of those who, by exaggerating their religious devotion, become prey for the cupidity of imposters."

Reception
The Canberra Times acclaimed it as one of the best productions of the year.

The Age called it "a thoroughly enjoyable experience."

References

External links
 

1965 television plays
1965 Australian television episodes
1960s Australian television plays
Black-and-white television episodes
Wednesday Theatre (season 1) episodes
Works based on Tartuffe